Kevin Conrad (born 10 August 1990) is a German professional footballer who plays as a centre-back for  club SV Elversberg.

References

External links
 
 

1990 births
Living people
German footballers
Association football central defenders
3. Liga players
Regionalliga players
TSG 1899 Hoffenheim II players
TSG 1899 Hoffenheim players
Chemnitzer FC players
SV Waldhof Mannheim players
SV Elversberg players